Thomas Macfarlane (1811–1885) was a 19th-century Member of Parliament from the Auckland Region, New Zealand.

He represented the Northern Division electorate from 1867 to 1870, when he retired. He was the business partner of Thomas Henderson.

References

1811 births
1885 deaths
Members of the New Zealand House of Representatives
New Zealand MPs for North Island electorates
19th-century New Zealand politicians